Nanning is the capital and largest city by population of the Guangxi Zhuang Autonomous Region in Southern China. It is known as the "Green City (绿城) " because of its abundance of lush subtropical foliage. Located in the South of Guangxi, Nanning is surrounded by a hilly basin, with a warm, monsoon-influenced humid subtropical climate.

Beginning in 1949, as it underwent sustained industrial growth, Nanning's economy began developing beyond its former role, and the city became essentially a commercial and administrative centre. Today, Nanning is considered the economic, financial and cultural center of Guangxi, and the chief centre for the training of the Zhuang minority in Guangxi. The People's Park is located in the center of the city.

The city is home to several notable universities, including Guangxi University, Guangxi Medical University, Guangxi University for Nationalities and Guangxi Arts University.

History

Nanning, an ancient city with a long history and rich culture, was part of Baiyue ethnic groups in the ancient time. In the first year of Daxing period of Eastern Jin Dynasty (AD 318), Jinxing County, established here as one of the county towns, ushered a history of 1700 years of Nanning organizational system. During the Zhenguan period of Tang dynasty (AD 632), it was renamed Yong prefecture (Yongzhou) and established Yongzhou government seat, which is why it has been called Yong for short. In the first year of Taiding period of Yuan dynasty (AD1318), Yongzhou was renamed Nanning, meaning the Pacified South.

Nanning was once the territory of the Baiyue people and became the capital of Jinxing Prefecture which was separated from Yulin Prefecture of the Eastern Jin Dynasty.

In 1076 during the Lý–Song War Yongshou was besieged by Lý forces. Under the leadership of Su Jian, the garrison held out for forty-two days before succumbing. The city was razed to the ground and its people massacred by Lý dynasty.

In the Yuan dynasty in 1324, it was renamed Nanning Lu (Nanning Circuit) of Yongzhou. Historically, Nanning was famous for trade, and had permanent business offices from other areas in China since the Song dynasty.

In the Ming dynasty Nanning developed into an economic center of the Zuo River and the You River with the reputation of "Little Nanjing".

On 4 December 1949, Nanning was captured by the CPC; in January 1950, Nanning municipality was set up, and identified as the capital city of Guangxi on 8 February of the same year; in March 1958, the Guangxi Zhuang Autonomous Region was established, and Nanning municipality was the capital city.

Nanning serves as host for the annual China-ASEAN EXPO (CASEAN EXPO) which began in 2004 and was the venue for the 2006 "World Robotics Olympiad".

Administrative divisions
Nanning has jurisdiction over 7 districts, 1 county-level city, 4 counties, and 6 development zones.

Development Zones:
Nanning High-Tech Business DZ
Nanning Economic and technology DZ
Nanning Overseas Chinese Investment Zone
Nanning Qingxiu Mountain Resort/ Tourism Area
Nanning Xiangsi Lake New Area
Nanning Liujing Industrial Park

Cityscape
The second tallest building in Nanning is the World Trade Commerce City at 218 meters.

Nanning has many parks with tropical lush green landscape, it is one of the "greenest" cities in China, and it's known as "Green City"(). Nanning's downtown skyline is rapidly changing and the city is becoming an important hub in China.

Recently, the government has begun a citywide beautification plan which aimed to further clean up the city and improve its image. This involved curtailing the number of street-side food vendors operating without proper licenses and restricting parking in busy streets. The program has achieved initial success, long-term efforts are still needed to deliver lasting results.

Economy

Nanning's GDP in 2015 was 341 billion RMB. The GDP per capita was $7,844.

Foreign exports in 2007 were US$10 billion. Foreign fixed asset investment was 34.3 billion RMB. Nanning has six development zones and industrial parks, three of which accounted for 6 billion RMB of Nanning's GDP, more than 8 percent of Nanning's total.

Mineral resources include gold, iron, manganese, aluminum, quartz, silver, indium, coal, marble, and granite. One third of China's different types of mineral resources are found in Nanning.

Industrial zones
Guilin High-tech Industrial Development Zone
Nanning Economic & Technological Development Area

Transportation

Metro

Nanning Metro system is known for its Nanning Rail Transit (NNRT), expected to comprise a total of nine lines. The first was completed and put into operation in June 2016, the second begin operation in December 2017, while lines 3 and 4 are now under construction. Line 1 connects the East and West of Nanning, linking the financial and political center and the academic and research center of Nanning.

Stations of Line 1 from the West to East are: SHIBU - Nanning College for Vocational Technology - PENGFEI LU - XIXIANGTANG Coach Station - Guangxi University for Nationalities - QINGCHUAN - Nanning Zoo - LUBAN LU - Guangxi University - BAICANGLING - Nanning Railway Station - CHAOYANG Square - XINMIN LU - MINZU Square - MACUN - NANHU - JINHU Square - Convention & Exhibition Center - WANXIANGCHENG - ASEAN Business District - FENGLING -!LANGDON Coach Station - BAIHUALING - FOZILING - Nanning East Railway Station.

Air
Nanning Wuxu International Airport

Rail

Nanning has two major railway stations: Nanning railway station and Nanning East railway station. The latter one is newer and also the main destination of high-speed trains. A third, Nanning North railway station, is set to open in 2023 with the Guiyang–Nanning high-speed railway.

Nanning railway station is a railway junction for the Nanning–Kunming, Nanning–Guangzhou and Hunan–Guangxi Railways. There are also plans to build a high-speed railway to Pingxiang on the Vietnamese border. The goal is to better integrate Pan-Pearl River Delta and southeast China with members of the ASEAN.

At the end of 2013, some high-speed service has been introduced on the Hunan–Guangxi railway and on the railway line that connects Nanning with Beihai (as well as its branch to Fangchenggang).

Guangxi is also a conjunction of Guangzhou-Guiyang Highspeed Rail.

Highways
China National Highway 210
China National Highway 322
China National Highway 324
China National Highway 325
G72 Quanzhou–Nanning Expressway
G7201 Nanning Ring Expressway
G7211 Nanning–Youyiguan Expressway
G75 Lanzhou–Haikou Expressway
G80 Guangzhou–Kunming Expressway

Flora and fauna
Nanning's warm climate gives it a large amount of biodiversity. There are many species of animals and more than 3,000 species of plants. The city flower is the Jaba flower, an evergreen shrub, and the city tree is the almond tree which is regarded as the backbone tree used for greening and landscaping throughout the city.

Twin towns – sister cities

Nanning is twinned with:

 Antananarivo, Madagascar (2015)
 Banjul, Gambia (1987)
 Bogor, Indonesia (2008)
 Bundaberg, Australia (1998)
 Champasak, Laos (2010)
 Commerce City, United States (2009)
 Crema, Italy (2016)
 Davao City, Philippines (2007)
 Grudziądz, Poland (2011)
 Gwacheon, South Korea (2005)
 Haiphong, Vietnam (2006)
 Iquique, Chile (2008)
 Ivano-Frankivsk, Ukraine (2019)
 Khon Kaen, Thailand (2002)
 Klagenfurt, Austria (2002)

 Lilongwe, Malawi (2011)
 Provo, United States (2000)
 Sihanoukville, Cambodia (2007)
 Val-de-Marne, France (2008)

 Yangon, Myanmar (2009)

Demographics
As of the 2020 Chinese census, Nanning had a population of 8,741,584, of which 5,293,359 live in its built-up (or metro) area made of 6 urban districts, Wuming District not being conurbated yet. Nanning is a city in which Zhuang ethnic group live in compact communities. Thirty-five ethnic groups live in compact communities in Nanning, including people of Zhuang, Han, Yao, Hui, Miao, Dong, and Man minorities.

Culture

Nanning is the center of science and technology, education, culture and health in Guangxi Zhuang Autonomous Region. There are altogether 54 scientific research institutes subordinate to districts. 10 colleges and 50 trade schools are training specialised personnel of all kinds. Now there are 62 mass cultural organizations, 13 performing groups, 8 cinemas, 285 projecting units, over 70 karaoke halls and over 1000 newsstands. Bookshops and cultural markets can be found everywhere.

Food
Nanning has not only local cuisine but also food from other areas of China and abroad. Traditional food culture can be found around most streets of Nanning. Nanning food shares the style of Cantonese food and of Southeast Asia. Chinese cuisine including Guangdong, Sichuan, Hunan and Jiangsu as well as Japanese, Thai and Western cuisines can be found.

Rice noodles are very popular among the Nanning people. Laoyou rice noodles are the most famous, while other noodle dishes such as Guilin rice noodles and hand made noodles can be found. Laoyou rice noodles (means old friend rice noodles) are made of fry up pepper, sour bamboo shoots, black beans and garlic, then pork, and then soup and rice noodles. The sour-spicy tasting noodles are a very popular and cheap favorite street food for all meals (breakfast, lunch and dinner) in Nanning.

Tourism

Nanning is close to scenic Guilin, with its world-famous hillscape, northern and western Guangxi and its minority villages, and the border with Vietnam in the south.

Tourist attractions in Nanning include Guangxi Museum, People's Park with the Zhenning Fort, Mount Qingxiu, Guangxi Medicinal Herb Botanical Garden, and Yangmei Ancient Town.

Other places of interest include Nanhu Park, Shishan Park and Nanning Zoo.

Colleges and universities
Nanning University
Nanning Normal University
Guangxi University
Guangxi Arts College()
Guangxi Medical University()
Guangxi University for Nationalities()
Guangxi University of Chinese Medicine
Guangxi University of Finance and Economics()
Guangxi Police College()

Note: Institutions without full-time bachelor programs are not listed.

Notable people
 

Shao Changchun; unaffiliated event organizer, violin maker, and academician
Wang Ou; actress and model
Zhou Mi; badminton player

See also
 People's Hospital of Guangxi Zhuang Autonomous Region
 Silver Lining Foundation

References

External links

Nanning Government website

 
310s establishments
Cities in Guangxi
Prefecture-level divisions of Guangxi
Provincial capitals in China
National Forest Cities in China
4th-century establishments in China